John Duthoit (4 November 1918 – 2001) was an English professional footballer who played as a full back in the Football League for York City, in non-League football for Carlton United and Boston United and was on the books of Leeds United without making a league appearance.

References

1918 births
Footballers from Leeds
2001 deaths
English footballers
Association football fullbacks
Leeds United F.C. players
York City F.C. players
Boston United F.C. players
English Football League players